Pierre de Sonnaz (died 1410) was a Roman Catholic prelate who served as Bishop of Aosta (1399–1410).

Biography
On 31 October 1399, Pierre de Sonnaz was appointed during the papacy of Pope Boniface IX as Bishop of Aosta.
On 25 January 1400, he was consecrated bishop by Jacques de' Cavalli, Bishop of Vercelli, with Boniface della Torre, Bishop of Ivrea, serving as co-consecrators.
He served as Bishop of Aosta until his death in 1410.

References

External links and additional sources
 (for Chronology of Bishops) 
 (for Chronology of Bishops)  

14th-century Italian Roman Catholic bishops
15th-century Italian Roman Catholic bishops
Bishops appointed by Pope Boniface IX
1410 deaths